The Irano-Anatolian region is a biodiversity hotspot designated by Conservation International, extending across portions of Armenia, Azerbaijan, Georgia, Iraq, Iran, Turkey, and Turkmenistan. 

It includes highlands of the central and eastern Anatolian Plateau as well as the Zagros, Alborz, and Kopet Dag mountain ranges.

The ecoregions included within the hotspot are:

 Central Anatolian steppe
 Central Anatolian deciduous forests
 Eastern Anatolian deciduous forests
 Eastern Anatolian montane steppe
 Elburz Range forest steppe
 Kopet Dag woodlands and forest steppe
 Zagros Mountains forest steppe

External links
Conservation International: Irano-Anatolian Biodiversity hotspot

Ecoregions of Asia

Geography of Western Asia
Alborz (mountain range)
Palearctic ecoregions